The American Telemedicine Association (ATA), established in 1993, is a non-profit organization whose goal is to promote access to medical care for consumers and health professionals via telecommunications technology (alternatively referred to as Telemedicine, telehealth or eHealth). Membership in the American Telemedicine Association is open to individuals, companies, and other healthcare and technology organizations.

Mission and objectives
The American Telemedicine Association is a resource and advocates for promoting access to medical care for consumers and health professionals via telecommunications technology. The American Telemedicine Association seeks to bring together diverse groups from traditional medicine, academic medical centers, technology and telecommunications companies, e-health, medical societies, government and others to overcome barriers to the advancement of telemedicine through the professional, ethical, and equitable improvement in health care delivery. The American Telemedicine Association is governed by a board of directors elected by the American Telemedicine Association's membership.

Activities
The American Telemedicine Association implements its objectives by:
 Educating the government about telemedicine is an essential component in the delivery of modern medical care.
 Serving as a clearinghouse for telemedical information and services.
 Fostering networking and collaboration among interests in medicine and technology.
 Promoting research and education including the sponsorship of scientific educational meetings and the Telemedicine and e-Health Journal.
 Spearheading the development of appropriate clinical and industry policies and standards.

Services
The American Telemedicine Association provides a range of services for its members and the industry as a whole.
 American Telemedicine Association Annual Meeting – the world's largest scientific meeting and exposition focusing exclusively on Telemedicine, with hundreds of presentations, posters and workshops.
 Online Member News Updates – news briefs via email about the latest event and activities affecting Telemedicine professionals.
 American Telemedicine Association Website – a resource for Telemedicine news and information.
 American Telemedicine Association Online Membership Directory – the source of who's who in Telemedicine.
 Telemedicine and e-Health – a peer-reviewed publication on clinical Telemedicine practice; technical advances and enabling technologies; continuing medical education; and the impact of Telemedicine on the quality, cost-effectiveness, and access to health care. During the coronavirus pandemic, American Telemedicine Association CEO, Ann Mond Johnson said that Telemedicine would help lessen the exposure to the virus. 
 Special Interest Groups, Regional Chapters, and Discussion Groups – allow members to address issues related to the advancement and application of telemedicine in specific areas including home telehealth, ocular telehealth, technology, teledermatology, telemental health, telenursing, telepathology, and telerehabilitation.

See also
 EHealth
 General Maxwell R. Thurman Award
 List of video telecommunication services and product brands
 MHealth
 Telehealth
 Telemedicine
 Telerehabilitation

References

External links 
 

Medical associations based in the United States
Health informatics and eHealth associations
Telemedicine
1993 establishments in the United States
Organizations established in 1993
Medical and health organizations based in Washington, D.C.